The Grès supérieurs Formation (French for "Upper sandstone") is a geological formation in Laos whose strata date back to the Aptian to Albian stages of the Early Cretaceous. Dinosaur remains are among the fossils that have been recovered from the formation. It is equivalent to the Khok Kruat Formation of Thailand.

Fossil content 
The Grès supérieurs Formation has also yielded remains of indeterminate iguanodontians, as well as ornithopod and sauropod tracks.

Fish

Dinosaurs 

Other fossils
 Sauropod tracks 
 Iguanodontia indet (=Mandschurosaurus laosensis) 
 Euornithopod tracks

See also 
 List of dinosaur-bearing rock formations

References

Bibliography

Further reading 

 R. Allain, T. Xaisanavong, P. Richir and B. Khentavong. 2012. The first definitive Asian spinosaurid (Dinosauria: Theropoda) from the early cretaceous of Laos. Naturwissenschaften 99:369-377
 F. de Lapparent de Broin. 2004. A new Shachemydinae (Chelonii, Cryptodira) from the Lower Cretaceous of Laos: preliminary data. Comptes Rendus Palevol 3:387-396
 R. Allain, P. Taquet, B. Battail, J. Dejax, P. Richir, M. Véran, F. Limon-Duparcmeur, R. Vacant, O. Mateus, P. Sayarath, B. Khenthavong and S. Phouyavong. 1999. Un nouveau genre de dinosaure sauropode de la formation des Grès supérieurs (Aptien-Albien) du Laos [A new genus of sauropod dinosaur from the Grès supérieurs Formation (Aptian-Albian) of Laos]. Comptes Rendus de l'Académie des Sciences à Paris, Sciences de la Terre et des Planètes 329:609-616
 J.-H. Hoffet. 1942. Description de quelques ossements de Titanosauriens du Sénonien du Bas-Laos [Description of some titanosaurian bones from the Senonian of Lower Laos]. Comptes Rendus des Séances du Conseil des Recherches Scientifiques de l'Indochine 1942(1):49-57
 J.-H. Hoffett. 1936. Découverte du Crétacé en Indochine [Discovery of the Cretaceous in Indochina]. Comptes Rendus Hebdomadaires des Seances de l'Académie des Sciences 202:1867-1869

Geology of Laos
Lower Cretaceous Series of Asia
Albian Stage
Aptian Stage
Sandstone formations
Fluvial deposits
Ichnofossiliferous formations
Fossiliferous stratigraphic units of Asia
Paleontology in Laos